Shenel Gall (born 29 August 1991) is a Caymanian former footballer who played as a forward.

Career

Club career

In 2010, Gall joined Darton State Cavaliers in the United States. In 2012, she signed for FC Indiana in the United States, becoming the first professional female footballer from the Cayman Islands. In 2012, she signed for Swiss second tier club FC Neunkirch, helping them earn promotion to the Swiss top flight for the first time.

International career

At the age of 14, Gall debuted for the Cayman Islands during an 8-0 win over the Turks and Caicos Islands, where she scored 3 goals.

References

External links
 

1991 births
Women's association football forwards
Cayman Islands women's international footballers
Caymanian women's footballers
Darton State Cavaliers women's soccer players
Expatriate women's footballers in Switzerland
Expatriate women's soccer players in the United States
F.C. Indiana players
FC Neunkirch players
Living people
Women's Premier Soccer League players